Jože Bertoncelj (6 April 1922 – 16 May 2012) was a Slovenian alpine skier who competed for Yugoslavia in the 1948 Winter Olympics.

References

1922 births
2012 deaths
Slovenian male alpine skiers
Olympic alpine skiers of Yugoslavia
Alpine skiers at the 1948 Winter Olympics
Sportspeople from Jesenice, Jesenice